Dholai is a village in Narsingpur Tehsil in Cachar District of Assam State, India. It is located 30 km towards South from District headquarters Silchar. 22 km from Narsingpur

About Dholai
Dholai is a village in Narsingpur Tehsil in Cachar District of Assam State, India. It is located 30 km towards South from District headquarters Silchar. 22 km from Narsingpur. 235 km from State capital Dispur
Dholai Pin code is 788114 and postal head office is Dholai Bazar.

Geography
Dholai is located at 24° 35' 44.7972 N and 92° 50' 47.8572 E. It has an average elevation of 26 metres (85.3018 feet).

Demographics
The population of Dholai village approximately 10,000.

Language
 Meitei, bishnupriya manipuri, Bengali, Dimasa and Sylheti is the Local Language here

Education
 Bam Nityananda Multi Purpose H.s School
 Ideal English School
 Rajendra Roy Memorial Junior College

Neighbourhood
  Bhaga Bazar
 Vairengte
 Lailapur
 Channighat
 Silchar

Neighbouring villages
Debipur
Mahadebpur
Narsingpur
Channighat
Chandpur
Cleverhouse
Derby
Jamalpur
Jibangram
Kajidahar
Nagdirgram
Panibhora
Puthikhal
Rajnagar
Saptagram
Shawrertal

Connectivity
There is no railway station near Dholai within 30 km.  However, Silchar Railway Station, a major railway station is 35 km from Dholai. NH 54 connects Silchar to Dholai en- route to Aizawl; vehicles regularly ply between Silchar to Dholai during Daytime.

See also
Silchar
Dholai
Sonai

References 

Villages in Cachar district